"Believe" (stylized in Japanese as "believe") is a song recorded by Japanese female trio Kalafina. It was released as a stand-alone single to promote the Japanese anime visual novel Fate/stay night in November 2014. "Believe" was the group's second single from their fifth studio album far on the water. The song was written by Yuki Kajiura, who also composed and produced the single, which she has done for the group since their debut.

"Believe" received positive reviews from most contemporary Japanese music critics, who praised the sound and likened the production values of the song. Commercially, the song charted moderately but managed to achieve wide charting positions in both Oricon and Billboard, equally peaking at number ten.

Background
In 2013, Kalafina had released their fourth studio album entitled Consolation in March. The album was fully produced, composed and written by Japanese music composer and producer Yuki Kajiura, who also formed the band in order to promote music within the anime and television scene in Japan. The album had charted at number three on the Oricon Albums Chart, making it the group's highest equal charting album to date on Oricon, which is second to their previous studio album After Eden (2011). The album lasted fifteen weeks on the chart, making it their longest charting album since their debut effort. Since the 2013 release, the group have promoted several singles for several anime series and television series in Japan. The group released two sequel albums; a red version and blue version off The Best, charting at number four and three respectively. To promote this, they released three singles that were in support of anime series and managed to chart moderately in Japan.

"Believe" is the group's first single from their upcoming fifth studio album. The song was written by Kajiura, along with composing and producing the single, which she has done for the group since their debut. The song was used in promotion for the Japanese anime visual novel Fate/stay night. The song was used as the ending credits for the Unlimited Blade Works series that aired in Japan and North America in late 2014. "Believe" was released in four formats; a stand-alone CD single, a CD+DVD edition, a CD+Blu-ray released and an anime-packaging CD+DVD edition.

Composition
"Believe" was written by Kajiura, along with composing and producing the single, which she has done for the group since their debut and has a time duration of four minutes and fifty-one seconds. Member Wakana Ōtaki commented on the song; "The music and the sound is very dashing [...] and is leisurely very melodious and bright." She stated that based on her opinion, "Believe" and the other tracks on the physical edition are inspired by ballad and soft rock music.

Lyrically, the song is about believing in one and another, both romantically and friendship-wise and is based on the themes off trust and hope. Although commenting that the lyrics were straightforward, band member Keiko Kubota said "I want people to feel and believe [...]" Then, third member Hikaru Masai said that the song demonstrates the difference between reality and virtual saying that "Believe" separates the observation of dreams and reality.

Chart performance
"Believe" achieved success in two Japanese markets; Oricon and the Japanese equivalent to Billboard. The song debuted at number ten on the Oricon Singles Chart of the weekend of December 1, 2014. The song fell from this position to number twenty three the next week, becoming the largest fall through that weekend. In the song's third week, the song fell off the top fifty completely and only lasted two weeks inside the top fifty and in total, the song charted for ten weeks, making it one of the group's lowest longevity singles but their first top ten single since "Kimi no Gin no Niwa". Based on the Oricon ranking, "Believe" is the group's sixth best selling single as of March 2015.

"Believe" has achieved higher success in several Japanese Billboard charts. The song also debuted at number ten on the Japan Hot 100. The song dropped to number thirty-four in its next charting week and fell to number seventy-seven in its third week course, its last week on the chart. The song debuted on the Billboard Hot Anime Based chart at number three and fell throughout its charting course.

Track list
CD single
"Believe" - 4:51
"In Every Nothing" - 4:36
"Lapis" - 3:48
"Believe" (Instrumental) - 4:51

Charts

References

2014 singles
2014 songs
Songs written by Yuki Kajiura
SME Records singles